Display PostScript (or DPS) is a 2D graphics engine system for computers which uses the PostScript (PS) imaging model and language (originally developed for computer printing) to generate on-screen graphics. To the basic PS system, DPS adds a number of features intended to ease working with bitmapped displays and improve performance of some common tasks.

Early versions of PostScript display systems were developed at Adobe Systems. During development of the NeXT computers, NeXT and Adobe collaborated to produce the official DPS system, which was released in 1987. NeXT used DPS throughout its history, while versions from Adobe were popular on Unix workstations for a time during the 1980s and 1990s.

Design 
In order to support interactive, on-screen use with reasonable performance, changes were needed:

 Multiple execution contexts: Unlike a printer environment where a PS interpreter processes one job at a time, DPS would be used in a number of windows at the same time, each with their own settings (colors, brush settings, scale, etc.). This required a modification to the system to allow it to keep several "contexts" (sets of state data) active, one for each process (window).
 Encoded names: Many of the procedures and data structures in PostScript are looked up by name, string identifier. In DPS these names could be replaced by integers, which are much faster for a computer to find.
 Interaction support: A number of procedures were defined to handle interaction, including hit detection.
 Halftone phase: In order to improve scrolling performance, DPS only drew the small portion of the window that became visible, shifting the rest of the image instead of re-drawing it. However this meant that the halftones might not line up, producing visible lines and boxes in the display of graphics. DPS included additional code to properly handle these cases. Modern full-color displays with no halftones have made this idea mostly obsolete.
 Incremental updates: In printing applications the PS code is interpreted until it gets a showpage at which point it is actually printed out. This is not suitable for a display situation where a large number of minor updates are needed all the time. DPS included modes to allow semi-realtime display as the instructions were received from the user programs.
 Bitmap font support: DPS added the ability to map PS fonts onto hand-drawn bitmap fonts and change from one to the other on the fly. Adobe PS's ability to display fonts on low resolution devices (significantly less than 300 dpi) was very poor. For example, a NeXT screen used only 96 dpi. This PS limitation was worked around by using hand-built bitmap fonts to provide passable quality. Later implementations of PS (including compatible replacements like Ghostscript) provided anti-aliased fonts on grayscale or colour displays, which significantly improved quality. However, this development was too late to be of much use. Modern displays are still around 100 dpi, but have very much superior font quality without using bitmap fonts.
 Programming language support: DPS introduced the concept of a "pswrap", which allowed developers to wrap PostScript code into a C language function which could then be called from an application.

DPS did not, however, add a windowing system. That was left to the implementation to provide, and DPS was meant to be used in conjunction with an existing windowing engine. This was often the X Window System, and in this form Display PostScript was later adopted by companies such as IBM and SGI for their workstations. Often the code needed to get from an X window to a DPS context was much more complicated than the entire rest of the DPS interface. This greatly limited the popularity of DPS when any alternative was available.

History 

The developers of NeXT wrote a completely new windowing engine to take full advantage of NeXT's object-oriented operating system. A number of commands were added to DPS to actually create the windows and to react to events, similar to but simpler than NeWS. The single API made programming at higher levels much easier and made NeXT one of the few systems to extensively use DPS. The user-space windowing system library NeXTSTEP used PostScript to draw items like titlebars and scrollers. This, in turn, made extensive use of pswraps, which were in turn wrapped in objects and presented to the programmer in object form.

Modern derivatives 

Apple's Mac OS X operating system uses a central window server (created entirely by Apple) that caches window graphics as bitmaps, instead of storing and executing PostScript code. A graphics library called Quartz 2D provides PostScript-style imaging using the PDF rendering model (a subset, plus tweaks, of the PostScript model), but this is used by application frameworks—there is no PostScript present in the Mac OS X window server. Apple chose to use this model for a variety of reasons, including the avoidance of licensing fees for DPS and more efficient support of legacy Carbon and Classic code; QuickDraw-based applications use bitmapped drawing exclusively. Adobe's copyright stipulations said by some to apply to the PDF standard are thereby purported to be much less restrictive, granting, it has been claimed (i.e., here, by a previous author) conditional copyright permission to anyone to use the format in software applications free of charge.

See also 
 PostScript Standard Encoding (PostScript character set)
 NeXT character set
 NeWS
 Quartz 2D

References

Further reading 
 (NB. This edition also contains a description of Display PostScript, which is no longer discussed in the third edition.)

External links 
 Description at C2 Wiki
 GNU/BackBone
 The most recent PDF specification, version 1.7
 PostScript Language Reference, Second Edition
 Display PostScript reference documents

NeXT
PostScript
Adobe